Denis Huseinbašić (born 3 July 2001) is a professional footballer who plays as a midfielder for Bundesliga team 1. FC Köln. He started his senior career at Kickers Offenbach, before joining Köln in 2022.

Club career

Early career
Huseinbašić started playing football at his hometown club SpVgg Erbach, which he joined in 2009. In 2011, he joined Darmstadt 98. Two years later, he moved to Eintracht Frankfurt. In 2018, he switched to Kickers Offenbach, with whom he made his senior debut and scored his first goal. He scored his first career hat-trick in a victory over FSV Frankfurt on 14 May 2022.

1. FC Köln
In June 2022, Huseinbašić signed a three-year deal with 1. FC Köln. He made his official debut for the team on 3 September against VfL Wolfsburg. On 9 October, he scored his first goal for Köln against Borussia Mönchengladbach.

Career statistics

Club

References

External links

2001 births
Living people
People from Erbach im Odenwald
Footballers from Hesse
German people of Bosnia and Herzegovina descent
Association football midfielders
Kickers Offenbach players
1. FC Köln players
1. FC Köln II players
Regionalliga players
Bundesliga players
Germany under-21 international footballers